Kabinett (literal meaning: cabinet), or sometimes Kabinettwein (literal meaning: a wine set aside in a cabinet), is a German language wine term for a wine which is made from fully ripened grapes of the main harvest, typically picked in September, and are usually made in a light style. In the German wine classification system, Kabinett is the lowest level of Prädikatswein, lower in ripeness than Spätlese.

In Austria, Kabinett is subcategory of Qualitätswein rather than a Prädikatswein, and the term always designates a dry wine.

In the Czech Republic, Kabinet is a category of Quality Wine with Predicate (Czech: Jakostní víno s přívlastkem). Wines of this style are usually light and dry.

History 
The term Kabinett, also known as Cabinet, originally implied a wine of superior quality, set aside for later sale. It is essentially the German version of the wine term Reserve. The term originated with the cistercian monks at Eberbach Abbey in Rheingau, where the first recorded use of the term Cabinet occurred in 1712. The abbey's best wines were set aside to be stored in a special cellar built in 1245, and it was later known as the Cabinet cellar, or Cabinet-Keller. However it is also recorded that the first official Cabinet Cellar was built in 1716 in Schloss Vollrads, a winery in the nearby town, Oestrich-Winkel and there was no evidence shown that Eberbach Abbey ordered its own Cabinet Cellar until 1739. 

Before 1971, the term Cabinet or Kabinett often followed the name of the grape varietal, for example, a wine might be a "Trockenbeerenauslese Cabinet". The term is superfluous under current German wine law, although it can still be found on older bottles.

In 1971, the term Kabinett was officially noted in German wine law, and it was given its current definition which applies to wines which are light and non-chaptalized. Kabinett's current definition differs greatly from its etymological implications of it being a reserve wine. Before 1971, the terms Naturwein (natural wine) or Natuerrein (naturally pure) were used in place of Kabinett. These terms designated non-chaptalized wine, where no other designations, such as Spätlese or Auslese, applied.

Requirements

German definition

The minimum requirements, under current wine law, for a wine to be labelled Kabinett are as follows:

 The wine must have a must density of between 67 and 82 degrees Oechsle, depending on the region (wine growing zone) and grape variety.
 The wine must not undergo chaptalisation.

Austrian definition

The minimum requirements, under current wine law, for a wine to be labelled Kabinett are as follows:

 The wine must have a minimum must density of 17 degrees KMW (equal to 85 °Oechsle).
 The alcohol content may not exceed 13% ABV.
 The residual sugar content may not exceed 9 grams per liter.
 The wine must not undergo chaptalisation -  a notable exception from the rules which apply to other Qualitätsweine.

Czech definition

The minimum requirements, under current Czech wine law, for a wine to be labeled Kabinet are as follows:

 The wine must be produced from grapes grown within a single defined wine sub-region.
 The wine must have a minimum must density of 19 °NM (equal to 84 °Oechsle).
 The wine must not undergo chaptalisation.

Style 

Since Kabinett wines may not be chaptalized, in contrast with other Qualitätswein (QbA), they tend to possess the lowest alcohol content of all German wines, despite the fact the requirements are more stringent than other QbA.

Kabinett wines are often noted for having a pronounced light and elegant character when from the colder German wine regions, such as Mosel, and in wines made from the grape variety Riesling (which dominates much of the coldest German regions).

Typically, a Riesling Kabinett from Mosel exhibits a high acidity, with floral aromas, and often hints of slate and minerality. In cooler regions, semi-sweet Kabinett wines have an alcohol content of around 7-8% ABV and dry Kabinett wines are usually around 10-11% ABV. When made in other regions, or from other grape varieties, this can vary. For example, a dry Kabinett made in Baden or the Palatinate made from a Pinot varietal may well have an alcohol content of 13% ABV.

Typical German Kabinett wines are usually best enjoyed when aged for between one and five years. However, some better examples can be cellared for over a decade.

References 

German wine
Austrian wine
Czech wine
Wine classification
German words and phrases